The 1874 St Ives by-election was fought on 28 December 1874.  The byelection was fought due to the death of the incumbent Conservative MP, Edward Davenport.  It was won by the Conservative candidate Charles Praed who received 617 votes against Liberal candidate Sir Francis Lycett's 552 votes. During the  election, the town held a holiday, with shops closed and ships not leaving harbour.

Praed's election was later declared void, resulting in a further by-election in 1875, where Praed was returned again to the seat.

References

1874 in England
St Ives, Cornwall
1874 elections in the United Kingdom
By-elections to the Parliament of the United Kingdom in Cornish constituencies
19th century in Cornwall
December 1874 events